Set Theory: An Introduction to Independence Proofs is a textbook and reference work in set theory by Kenneth Kunen.  It starts from basic notions, including the ZFC axioms, and quickly develops combinatorial notions such as trees, Suslin's problem, ◊, and Martin's axiom. It develops some basic model theory (rather specifically aimed at models of set theory) and the theory of Gödel's constructible universe L. The book then proceeds to describe the method of forcing.

Kunen completely rewrote the book for the 2011 edition (under the title "Set Theory"), including more model theory.

References
 
 
 

1980 non-fiction books
Mathematics textbooks
Set theory